Tricolorul LMV Ploiești was a professional men's volleyball club based in Ploiești, Romania, that competed in the CEV Challenge Cup.

Tricolorul LMV Ploiești suddenly disbanded in the year when the club achieved its highest performance, winning the Romanian title.

Honours

Domestic 
 Divizia A1 
 Winners (1): 2018  
 Cupa României 
 Winners (1): 2018

See also
 Romania men's national volleyball team

References

External links 
CEV profile
Voleiromania profile

Sport in Ploiești
Romanian volleyball clubs
Volleyball clubs established in 2007
Volleyball clubs disestablished in 2018
2007 establishments in Romania
2018 disestablishments in Romania